The following is a list of episodes for animated television series Monster Allergy.

Series overview

Episodes

Pilot

Season 1 (2006–2008)

Season 2 (2008–2009)

References 
 Monster Allergy on TV.com.
 Episode guide of Monster Allergy in telebisyon.net
 List of Episodes of Monster Allergy in teletoon.fr
 Cartoon Monster Allergy to watch online

Lists of Italian animated television series episodes
Episodes